Freddie Lee Scott Jr.  (born August 26, 1974)  is a former American football wide receiver. He played for the Atlanta Falcons from 1996 to 1997 and Indianapolis Colts in 1998.
His father Freddie Scott and his brother Brandon Scott played for Bowling Green State University.

References

1974 births
Living people
American football wide receivers
Penn State Nittany Lions football players
Atlanta Falcons players
Indianapolis Colts players